Udhao is a 2013 Bangladeshi film directed and written by Amit Ashraf. It was released on September 28 on Star Cineplex and in October 4 commercially in around five cinemas. The film has brought home seven international awards and grants. The casts of the film includes Shahed Ali and Shakil Ahmed in the role of two protagonists – Babu and Akbar respectively – along with Animesh Aich, Ritu Sattar, Quazi Nawshaba Ahmed, Shahin Akhtar Swarna, Saiful Islam and Ithila Islam.

Plot

Background
No song is added to the film as a separate item. There are only two folk numbers by Fakir Laal Mia that the actors sometimes hum keeping natural flow of the plot. Visitors at the Cineplex welcomed the director and spoke highly of the production.

"It was wonderful. Good story and good execution of the story," said popular singer Anusheh Anadil. "Among the actors Shahed Ali in the role of Babu and Shakil Ahmed in the role of Akbar were brilliant," said Kollol Kumar, a visitor. 
The film is the debutant production of Kazi House Productions.

Cast
 Monir Ahmed as Akbar Rahman
 Shahed Ali as Babu
 Shakil Ahmed 
 Quazi Nawshaba Ahmed as Mita
 Animesh Aich as Raj
 Ritu Sattar as Remi Rahman
 Shahin Akter Swarna as Runa
 Saiful Islam 
 Ithila Islam

References

 
 
 
Udhao: reality haunts - New Age

External links

2013 films
2013 drama films
Bengali-language Bangladeshi films
Bangladeshi drama films
2010s Bengali-language films